Starfish or sea stars are star-shaped echinoderms belonging to the class Asteroidea. Common usage frequently finds these names being also applied to ophiuroids, which are correctly referred to as brittle stars or basket stars. Starfish are also known as asteroids due to being in the class Asteroidea. About 1,900 species of starfish live on the seabed in all the world's oceans, from warm, tropical zones to frigid, polar regions.

Starfish are marine invertebrates. They typically have a central disc and usually five arms, though some species have a larger number of arms. The aboral or upper surface may be smooth, granular or spiny, and is covered with overlapping plates. Many species are brightly coloured in various shades of red or orange, while others are blue, grey or brown. Starfish have tube feet operated by a hydraulic system and a mouth at the centre of the oral or lower surface. They are opportunistic feeders and are mostly predators on benthic invertebrates. Several species have specialized feeding behaviours including eversion of their stomachs and suspension feeding. They have complex life cycles and can reproduce both sexually and asexually. Most can regenerate damaged parts or lost arms and they can shed arms as a means of defense. The Asteroidea occupy several significant ecological roles. Starfish, such as the ochre sea star (Pisaster ochraceus) and the reef sea star (Stichaster australis), have become widely known as examples of the keystone species concept in ecology. The tropical crown-of-thorns starfish (Acanthaster planci) is a voracious predator of coral throughout the Indo-Pacific region, and the northern Pacific sea star is considered to be one of the world's 100 worst invasive species.

The fossil record for starfish is ancient, dating back to the Ordovician around 450 million years ago, but it is rather sparse, as starfish tend to disintegrate after death. Only the ossicles and spines of the animal are likely to be preserved, making remains hard to locate. With their appealing symmetrical shape, starfish have played a part in literature, legend, design and popular culture. They are sometimes collected as curios, used in design or as logos, and in some cultures, despite possible toxicity, they are eaten.

Anatomy

Most starfish have five arms that radiate from a central disc, but the number varies with the group. Some species have six or seven arms and others have 10–15 arms. The Antarctic Labidiaster annulatus can have over fifty.

Body wall

The body wall consists of a thin cuticle, an epidermis consisting of a single layer of cells, a thick dermis formed of connective tissue and a thin coelomic myoepithelial layer, which provides the longitudinal and circular musculature. The dermis contains an endoskeleton of calcium carbonate components known as ossicles. These are honeycombed structures composed of calcite microcrystals arranged in a lattice. They vary in form, with some bearing external granules, tubercles and spines, but most are tabular plates that fit neatly together in a tessellated manner and form the main covering of the aboral surface. Some are specialised structures such as the madreporite (the entrance to the water vascular system), pedicellariae and paxillae. Pedicellariae are compound ossicles with forceps-like jaws. They remove debris from the body surface and wave around on flexible stalks in response to physical or chemical stimuli while continually making biting movements. They often form clusters surrounding spines. Paxillae are umbrella-like structures found on starfish that live buried in sediment. The edges of adjacent paxillae meet to form a false cuticle with a water cavity beneath in which the madreporite and delicate gill structures are protected. All the ossicles, including those projecting externally, are covered by the epidermal layer.

Several groups of starfish, including Valvatida and Forcipulatida, possess pedicellariae. In Forcipulatida, such as Asterias and Pisaster, they occur in pompom-like tufts at the base of each spine, whereas in the Goniasteridae, such as Hippasteria phrygiana, the pedicellariae are scattered over the body surface. Some are thought to assist in defence, while others aid in feeding or in the removal of organisms attempting to settle on the starfish's surface. Some species like Labidiaster annulatus, Rathbunaster californicus and Novodinia antillensis use their large pedicellariae to capture small fish and crustaceans.

There may also be papulae, thin-walled protrusions of the body cavity that reach through the body wall and extend into the surrounding water. These serve a respiratory function. The structures are supported by collagen fibres set at right angles to each other and arranged in a three-dimensional web with the ossicles and papulae in the interstices. This arrangement enables both easy flexion of the arms by the starfish and the rapid onset of stiffness and rigidity required for actions performed under stress.

Water vascular system

The water vascular system of the starfish is a hydraulic system made up of a network of fluid-filled canals and is concerned with locomotion, adhesion, food manipulation and gas exchange. Water enters the system through the madreporite, a porous, often conspicuous, sieve-like ossicle on the aboral surface. It is linked through a stone canal, often lined with calcareous material, to a ring canal around the mouth opening. A set of radial canals leads off this; one radial canal runs along the ambulacral groove in each arm. There are short lateral canals branching off alternately to either side of the radial canal, each ending in an ampulla. These bulb-shaped organs are joined to tube feet (podia) on the exterior of the animal by short linking canals that pass through ossicles in the ambulacral groove. There are usually two rows of tube feet but in some species, the lateral canals are alternately long and short and there appear to be four rows. The interior of the whole canal system is lined with cilia.

When longitudinal muscles in the ampullae contract, valves in the lateral canals close and water is forced into the tube feet. These extend to contact the substrate. Although the tube feet resemble suction cups in appearance, the gripping action is a function of adhesive chemicals rather than suction. Other chemicals and relaxation of the ampullae allow for release from the substrate. The tube feet latch on to surfaces and move in a wave, with one arm section attaching to the surface as another releases. Some starfish turn up the tips of their arms while moving which gives maximum exposure of the sensory tube feet and the eyespot to external stimuli.

Having descended from bilateral organisms, starfish may move in a bilateral fashion, particularly when hunting or in danger. When crawling, certain arms act as the leading arms, while others trail behind. Most starfish cannot move quickly, a typical speed being that of the leather star (Dermasterias imbricata), which can manage just  in a minute. Some burrowing species from the genera Astropecten and Luidia have points rather than suckers on their long tube feet and are capable of much more rapid motion, "gliding" across the ocean floor. When a starfish finds itself upside down, two adjacent arms are bent backwards to provide support, the opposite arm is used to stamp the ground while the two remaining arms are raised on either side; finally the stamping arm is released as the starfish turns itself over and recovers its normal stance.

Apart from their function in locomotion, the tube feet act as accessory gills. The water vascular system serves to transport oxygen from, and carbon dioxide to, the tube feet and also nutrients from the gut to the muscles involved in locomotion. Fluid movement is bidirectional and initiated by cilia. Gas exchange also takes place through other gills known as papulae, which are thin-walled bulges on the aboral surface of the disc and arms. Oxygen is transferred from these to the coelomic fluid, which acts as the transport medium for gasses. Oxygen dissolved in the water is distributed through the body mainly by the fluid in the main body cavity; the circulatory system may also play a minor role.

Digestive system and excretion

The gut of a starfish occupies most of the disc and extends into the arms. The mouth is located in the centre of the oral surface, where it is surrounded by a tough peristomial membrane and closed with a sphincter. The mouth opens through a short oesophagus into a stomach divided by a constriction into a larger, eversible cardiac portion and a smaller pyloric portion. The cardiac stomach is glandular and pouched, and is supported by ligaments attached to ossicles in the arms so it can be pulled back into position after it has been everted. The pyloric stomach has two extensions into each arm: the pyloric caeca. These are elongated, branched hollow tubes that are lined by a series of glands, which secrete digestive enzymes and absorb nutrients from the food. A short intestine and rectum run from the pyloric stomach to open at a small anus at the apex of the aboral surface of the disc.

Primitive starfish, such as Astropecten and Luidia, swallow their prey whole, and start to digest it in their cardiac stomachs. Shell valves and other inedible materials are ejected through their mouths. The semi-digested fluid is passed into their pyloric stomachs and caeca where digestion continues and absorption ensues. In more advanced species of starfish, the cardiac stomach can be everted from the organism's body to engulf and digest food. When the prey is a clam or other bivalve, the starfish pulls with its tube feet to separate the two valves slightly, and inserts a small section of its stomach, which releases enzymes to digest the prey. The stomach and the partially digested prey are later retracted into the disc. Here the food is passed on to the pyloric stomach, which always remains inside the disc. The retraction and contraction of the cardiac stomach is activated by a neuropeptide known as NGFFYamide.

Because of this ability to digest food outside the body, starfish can hunt prey much larger than their mouths. Their diets include clams and oysters, arthropods, small fish and gastropod molluscs. Some starfish are not pure carnivores, supplementing their diets with algae or organic detritus. Some of these species are grazers, but others trap food particles from the water in sticky mucus strands that are swept towards the mouth along ciliated grooves.

The main nitrogenous waste product is ammonia. Starfish have no distinct excretory organs; waste ammonia is removed by diffusion through the tube feet and papulae. The body fluid contains phagocytic cells called coelomocytes, which are also found within the hemal and water vascular systems. These cells engulf waste material, and eventually migrate to the tips of the papulae, where a portion of body wall is nipped off and ejected into the surrounding water. Some waste may also be excreted by the pyloric glands and voided with the faeces.

Starfish do not appear to have any mechanisms for osmoregulation, and keep their body fluids at the same salt concentration as the surrounding water. Although some species can tolerate relatively low salinity, the lack of an osmoregulation system probably explains why starfish are not found in fresh water or even in many estuarine environments.

Sensory and nervous systems

Although starfish do not have many well-defined sense organs, they are sensitive to touch, light, temperature, orientation and the status of the water around them. The tube feet, spines and pedicellariae are sensitive to touch. The tube feet, especially those at the tips of the rays, are also sensitive to chemicals, enabling the starfish to detect odour sources such as food. There are eyespots at the ends of the arms, each one made of 80–200 simple ocelli. These are composed of pigmented epithelial cells that respond to light and are covered by a thick, transparent cuticle that both protects the ocelli and acts to focus light. Many starfish also possess individual photoreceptor cells in other parts of their bodies and respond to light even when their eyespots are covered. Whether they advance or retreat depends on the species.

While a starfish lacks a centralized brain, it has a complex nervous system with a nerve ring around the mouth and a radial nerve running along the ambulacral region of each arm parallel to the radial canal. The peripheral nerve system consists of two nerve nets: a sensory system in the epidermis and a motor system in the lining of the coelomic cavity. Neurons passing through the dermis connect the two. The ring nerves and radial nerves have sensory and motor components and coordinate the starfish's balance and directional systems. The sensory component receives input from the sensory organs while the motor nerves control the tube feet and musculature. The starfish does not have the capacity to plan its actions. If one arm detects an attractive odour, it becomes dominant and temporarily over-rides the other arms to initiate movement towards the prey. The mechanism for this is not fully understood.

Circulatory system

The body cavity contains the circulatory or haemal system. The vessels form three rings: one around the mouth (the hyponeural haemal ring), another around the digestive system (the gastric ring) and the third near the aboral surface (the genital ring). The heart beats about six times a minute and is at the apex of a vertical channel (the axial vessel) that connects the three rings. At the base of each arm are paired gonads; a lateral vessel extends from the genital ring past the gonads to the tip of the arm. This vessel has a blind end and there is no continuous circulation of the fluid within it. This liquid does not contain a pigment and has little or no respiratory function but is probably used to transport nutrients around the body.

Secondary metabolites
Starfish produce a large number of secondary metabolites in the form of lipids, including steroidal derivatives of cholesterol, and fatty acid amides of sphingosine. The steroids are mostly saponins, known as asterosaponins, and their sulphated derivatives. They vary between species and are typically formed from up to six sugar molecules (usually glucose and galactose) connected by up to three glycosidic chains. Long-chain fatty acid amides of sphingosine occur frequently and some of them have known pharmacological activity. Various ceramides are also known from starfish and a small number of alkaloids have also been identified. The functions of these chemicals in the starfish have not been fully investigated but most have roles in defence and communication. Some are feeding deterrents used by the starfish to discourage predation. Others are antifoulants and supplement the pedicellariae to prevent other organisms from settling on the starfish's aboral surface. Some are alarm pheromones and escape-eliciting chemicals, the release of which trigger responses in conspecific starfish but often produce escape responses in potential prey. Research into the efficacy of these compounds for possible pharmacological or industrial use occurs worldwide.

Life cycle

Sexual reproduction

Most species of starfish are gonochorous, there being separate male and female individuals. These are usually not distinguishable externally as the gonads cannot be seen, but their sex is apparent when they spawn. Some species are simultaneous hermaphrodites, producing eggs and sperm at the same time and in a few of these, the same gonad, called an ovotestis, produces both eggs and sperm. Other starfish are sequential hermaphrodites. Protandrous individuals of species like Asterina gibbosa start life as males before changing sex into females as they grow older. In some species such as Nepanthia belcheri, a large female can split in half and the resulting offspring are males. When these grow large enough they change back into females.

Each starfish arm contains two gonads that release gametes through openings called gonoducts, located on the central disc between the arms. Fertilization is generally external but in a few species, internal fertilization takes place. In most species, the buoyant eggs and sperm are simply released into the water (free spawning) and the resulting embryos and larvae live as part of the plankton. In others, the eggs may be stuck to the undersides of rocks. In certain species of starfish, the females brood their eggs – either by simply enveloping them or by holding them in specialised structures. Brooding may be done in pockets on the starfish's aboral surface, inside the pyloric stomach (Leptasterias tenera) or even in the interior of the gonads themselves. Those starfish that brood their eggs by "sitting" on them usually assume a humped posture with their discs raised off the substrate. Pteraster militaris broods a few of its young and disperses the remaining eggs, that are too numerous to fit into its pouch. In these brooding species, the eggs are relatively large, and supplied with yolk, and they generally develop directly into miniature starfish without an intervening larval stage. The developing young are called lecithotrophic because they obtain their nutrition from the yolk as opposed to "planktotrophic" larvae that feed in the water column. In Parvulastra parvivipara, an intragonadal brooder, the young starfish obtain nutrients by eating other eggs and embryos in the brood pouch. Brooding is especially common in polar and deep-sea species that live in environments unfavourable for larval development and in smaller species that produce just a few eggs.

In the tropics, a plentiful supply of phytoplankton is continuously available for starfish larvae to feed on. Spawning takes place at any time of year, each species having its own characteristic breeding season. In temperate regions, the spring and summer brings an increase in food supplies. The first individual of a species to spawn may release a pheromone that serves to attract other starfish to aggregate and to release their gametes synchronously. In other species, a male and female may come together and form a pair. This behaviour is called pseudocopulation and the male climbs on top, placing his arms between those of the female. When she releases eggs into the water, he is induced to spawn. Starfish may use environmental signals to coordinate the time of spawning (day length to indicate the correct time of the year, dawn or dusk to indicate the correct time of day), and chemical signals to indicate their readiness to breed. In some species, mature females produce chemicals to attract sperm in the sea water.

Larval development

Most starfish embryos hatch at the blastula stage. The original ball of cells develops a lateral pouch, the archenteron. The entrance to this is known as the blastopore and it will later develop into the anus—together with chordates, echinoderms are deuterostomes, meaning the second (deutero) invagination becomes the mouth (stome); members of all other phyla are protostomes, and their first invagination becomes the mouth. Another invagination of the surface will fuse with the tip of the archenteron as the mouth while the interior section will become the gut. At the same time, a band of cilia develops on the exterior. This enlarges and extends around the surface and eventually onto two developing arm-like outgrowths. At this stage the larva is known as a bipinnaria. The cilia are used for locomotion and feeding, their rhythmic beat wafting phytoplankton towards the mouth.

The next stage in development is a brachiolaria larva and involves the growth of three short, additional arms. These are at the anterior end, surround a sucker and have adhesive cells at their tips. Both bipinnaria and brachiolaria larvae are bilaterally symmetrical. When fully developed, the brachiolaria settles on the seabed and attaches itself with a short stalk formed from the ventral arms and sucker. Metamorphosis now takes place with a radical rearrangement of tissues. The left side of the larval body becomes the oral surface of the juvenile and the right side the aboral surface. Part of the gut is retained, but the mouth and anus move to new positions. Some of the body cavities degenerate but others become the water vascular system and the visceral coelom. The starfish is now pentaradially symmetrical. Starfish of the order Paxillosida have no brachiolaria stage, with the bipinnaria larvae settling on the seabed and developing directly into juveniles.

Asexual reproduction

Some species of starfish in the three families Asterinidae, Asteriidae and Solasteridae are able to reproduce asexually as adults either by fission of their central discs or by autotomy of one or more of their arms. Which of these processes occurs depends on the genus. Single arms that regenerate a whole individual are called comet forms. The division of the starfish, either across its disc or at the base of the arm, is usually accompanied by a weakness in the structure that provides a fracture zone.

The larvae of several species of starfish can reproduce asexually before they reach maturity. They do this by autotomising some parts of their bodies or by budding. When such a larva senses that food is plentiful, it takes the path of asexual reproduction rather than normal development. Though this costs it time and energy and delays maturity, it allows a single larva to give rise to multiple adults when the conditions are appropriate.

Regeneration

Some species of starfish have the ability to regenerate lost arms and can regrow an entire new limb given time. A few can regrow a complete new disc from a single arm, while others need at least part of the central disc to be attached to the detached part. Regrowth can take several months or years, and starfish are vulnerable to infections during the early stages after the loss of an arm. A separated limb lives off stored nutrients until it regrows a disc and mouth and is able to feed again. Other than fragmentation carried out for the purpose of reproduction, the division of the body may happen inadvertently due to part being detached by a predator, or part may be actively shed by the starfish in an escape response. The loss of parts of the body is achieved by the rapid softening of a special type of connective tissue in response to nervous signals. This type of tissue is called catch connective tissue and is found in most echinoderms. An autotomy-promoting factor has been identified which, when injected into another starfish, causes rapid shedding of arms.

Lifespan

The lifespan of a starfish varies considerably between species, generally being longer in larger forms and in those with planktonic larvae. For example, Leptasterias hexactis broods a small number of large-yolked eggs. It reaches maturity in five years and has a maximum recorded lifespan of 34 years.

Ecology

Distribution and habitat

Echinoderms, including starfish, maintain a delicate internal electrolyte balance that is in equilibrium with sea water, making it impossible for them to live in a freshwater habitat. Starfish species inhabit all of the world's oceans. Habitats range from tropical coral reefs, rocky shores, tidal pools, mud, and sand to kelp forests, seagrass meadows and the deep-sea floor down to at least . The greatest diversity of species occurs in coastal areas.

Diet

Most species are generalist predators, eating microalgae, sponges, bivalves, snails and other small animals. The crown-of-thorns starfish consumes coral polyps, while other species are detritivores, feeding on decomposing organic material and faecal matter. A few are suspension feeders, gathering in phytoplankton; Henricia and Echinaster often occur in association with sponges, benefiting from the water current they produce. Various species have been shown to be able to absorb organic nutrients from the surrounding water, and this may form a significant portion of their diet.

The processes of feeding and capture may be aided by special parts; Pisaster brevispinus, the short-spined pisaster from the West Coast of America, can use a set of specialized tube feet to dig itself deep into the soft substrate to extract prey (usually clams). Grasping the shellfish, the starfish slowly pries open the prey's shell by wearing out its adductor muscle, and then inserts its everted stomach into the crack to digest the soft tissues. The gap between the valves need only be a fraction of a millimetre wide for the stomach to gain entry. Cannibalism has been observed in juvenile sea stars as early as four days after metamorphosis.

Ecological impact

Starfish are keystone species in their respective marine communities. Their relatively large sizes, diverse diets and ability to adapt to different environments makes them ecologically important. The term "keystone species" was in fact first used by Robert Paine in 1966 to describe a starfish, Pisaster ochraceus. When studying the low intertidal coasts of Washington state, Paine found that predation by P. ochraceus was a major factor in the diversity of species. Experimental removals of this top predator from a stretch of shoreline resulted in lower species diversity and the eventual domination of Mytilus mussels, which were able to outcompete other organisms for space and resources. Similar results were found in a 1971 study of Stichaster australis on the intertidal coast of the South Island of New Zealand. S. australis was found to have removed most of a batch of transplanted mussels within two or three months of their placement, while in an area from which S. australis had been removed, the mussels increased in number dramatically, overwhelming the area and threatening biodiversity.

The feeding activity of the omnivorous starfish Oreaster reticulatus on sandy and seagrass bottoms in the Virgin Islands appears to regulate the diversity, distribution and abundance of microorganisms. These starfish engulf piles of sediment removing the surface films and algae adhering to the particles. Organisms that dislike this disturbance are replaced by others better able to rapidly recolonise "clean" sediment. In addition, foraging by these migratory starfish creates diverse patches of organic matter, which may play a role in the distribution and abundance of organisms such as fish, crabs and sea urchins that feed on the sediment.

Starfish sometimes have negative effects on ecosystems. Outbreaks of crown-of-thorns starfish have caused damage to coral reefs in Northeast Australia and French Polynesia. A study in Polynesia found that coral cover declined drastically with the arrival of migratory starfish in 2006, dropping from 50% to under 5% in three years. This had a cascading effect on the whole benthic community and reef-feeding fish. Asterias amurensis is one of a few echinoderm invasive species. Its larvae likely arrived in Tasmania from central Japan via water discharged from ships in the 1980s. The species has since grown in numbers to the point where they threaten commercially important bivalve populations. As such, they are considered pests, and are on the Invasive Species Specialist Group's list of the world's 100 worst invasive species.

Sea Stars (starfish) are the main predators of kelp-eating sea urchins. Satellite imagery shows that sea urchin populations have exploded due to starfish mass deaths, and that by 2021, sea urchins have destroyed 95% of California's kelp forests.

Threats

Starfish may be preyed on by conspecifics, sea anemones, other starfish species, tritons, crabs, fish, gulls and sea otters. Their first lines of defence are the saponins present in their body walls, which have unpleasant flavours. Some starfish such as Astropecten polyacanthus also include powerful toxins such as tetrodotoxin among their chemical armoury, and the slime star can ooze out large quantities of repellent mucus. They also have body armour in the form of hard plates and spines. The crown-of-thorns starfish is particularly unattractive to potential predators, being heavily defended by sharp spines, laced with toxins and sometimes with bright warning colours. Other species protect their vulnerable tube feet and arm tips by lining their ambulacral grooves with spines and heavily plating their extremities.

Several species sometimes suffer from a wasting condition caused by bacteria in the genus Vibrio; however, a more widespread wasting disease, causing mass mortalities among starfish, appears sporadically. A paper published in November 2014 revealed the most likely cause of this disease to be a densovirus the authors named sea star-associated densovirus (SSaDV).
The protozoan Orchitophrya stellarum is known to infect the gonads of starfish and damage tissue. Starfish are vulnerable to high temperatures. This species has a unique ability to absorb seawater to keep itself cool when it is exposed to sunlight by a receding tide. It also appears to rely on its arms to absorb heat, so as to protect the central disc and vital organs like the stomach.

Starfish and other echinoderms are sensitive to marine pollution. The common starfish is considered to be a bioindicator for marine ecosystems. A 2009 study found that P. ochraceus is unlikely to be affected by ocean acidification as severely as other marine animals with calcareous skeletons. In other groups, structures made of calcium carbonate are vulnerable to dissolution when the pH is lowered. Their survival is likely due to the nodular nature of their skeletons, which are able to compensate for a shortage of carbonate by growing more fleshy tissue.

Evolution

Fossil record

Echinoderms first appeared in the fossil record in the Cambrian.  The first known asterozoans were the Somasteroidea, which exhibit characteristics of both groups. Starfish are infrequently found as fossils, possibly because their hard skeletal components separate as the animal decays. Despite this, there are a few places where accumulations of complete skeletal structures occur, fossilized in place in Lagerstätten – so-called "starfish beds".

By the late Paleozoic, the crinoids and blastoids were the predominant echinoderms, and some limestones from this period are made almost entirely from fragments from these groups. In the two major extinction events that occurred during the late Devonian and late Permian, the blastoids were wiped out and only a few species of crinoids survived. Many starfish species also became extinct in these events, but afterwards the surviving few species diversified rapidly within about sixty million years during the Early Jurassic and the beginning of the Middle Jurassic. A 2012 study found that speciation in starfish can occur rapidly. During the last 6,000 years, divergence in the larval development of Cryptasterina hystera and Cryptasterina pentagona has taken place, the former adopting internal fertilization and brooding and the latter remaining a broadcast spawner.

Diversity

The scientific name Asteroidea was given to starfish by the French zoologist de Blainville in 1830. It is derived from the Greek aster, ἀστήρ (a star) and the Greek eidos, εἶδος (form, likeness, appearance). The class Asteroidea belongs to the phylum Echinodermata. As well as the starfish, the echinoderms include sea urchins, sand dollars, brittle and basket stars, sea cucumbers and crinoids. The larvae of echinoderms have bilateral symmetry, but during metamorphosis this is replaced with radial symmetry, typically pentameric. Adult echinoderms are characterized by having a water vascular system with external tube feet and a calcareous endoskeleton consisting of ossicles connected by a mesh of collagen fibres. Starfish are included in the subphylum Asterozoa, the characteristics of which include a flattened, star-shaped body as adults consisting of a central disc and multiple radiating arms. The subphylum includes the two classes of Asteroidea, the starfish, and Ophiuroidea, the brittle stars and basket stars. Asteroids have broad-based arms with skeletal support provided by calcareous plates in the body wall while ophiuroids have clearly demarcated slender arms strengthened by paired fused ossicles forming jointed "vertebrae".

The starfish are a large and diverse class with over 1,900 living species. There are seven extant orders, Brisingida, Forcipulatida, Notomyotida, Paxillosida, Spinulosida, Valvatida and Velatida and two extinct ones, Calliasterellidae and Trichasteropsida. Living asteroids, the Neoasteroidea, are morphologically distinct from their forerunners in the Paleozoic. The taxonomy of the group is relatively stable but there is ongoing debate about the status of the Paxillosida, and the deep-water sea daisies, though clearly Asteroidea and currently included in Velatida, do not fit easily in any accepted lineage. Phylogenetic data suggests that they may be a sister group, the Concentricycloidea, to the Neoasteroidea, or that the Velatida themselves may be a sister group.

Living groups

 Brisingida (2 families, 17 genera, 111 species) 
Species in this order have a small, inflexible disc and 6–20 long, thin arms, which they use for suspension feeding. They have a single series of marginal plates, a fused ring of disc plates, a reduced number of aboral plates, crossed pedicellariae, and several series of long spines on the arms. They live almost exclusively in deep-sea habitats, although a few live in shallow waters in the Antarctic. In some species, the tube feet have rounded tips and lack suckers.

 Forcipulatida (6 families, 63 genera, 269 species) 
Species in this order have distinctive pedicellariae, consisting of a short stalk with three skeletal ossicles. They tend to have robust bodies and have tube feet with flat-tipped suckers usually arranged in four rows. The order includes well-known species from temperate regions, including the common starfish of North Atlantic coasts and rock pools, as well as cold-water and abyssal species.
 Notomyotida (1 family, 8 genera, 75 species) 
These starfish are deep-sea dwelling and have particularly flexible arms. The inner dorso-lateral surfaces of the arms contain characteristic longitudinal muscle bands. In some species, the tube feet lack suckers.

 Paxillosida (7 families, 48 genera, 372 species) 
This is a primitive order and members do not extrude their stomach when feeding, lack an anus and have no suckers on their tube feet. Papulae are plentiful on their aboral surface and they possess marginal plates and paxillae. They mostly inhabit soft-bottomed areas of sand or mud. There is no brachiolaria stage in their larval development. The comb starfish (Astropecten polyacanthus) is a member of this order.

 Spinulosida (1 family, 8 genera, 121 species) 
Most species in this order lack pedicellariae and all have a delicate skeletal arrangement with small or no marginal plates on the disc and arms. They have numerous groups of short spines on the aboral surface. This group includes the red starfish Echinaster sepositus.
 Valvatida (16 families, 172 genera, 695 species) 
Most species in this order have five arms and two rows of tube feet with suckers. There are conspicuous marginal plates on the arms and disc. Some species have paxillae and in some, the main pedicellariae are clamp-like and recessed into the skeletal plates. This group includes the cushion stars, the leather star and the sea daisies.
 Velatida (4 families, 16 genera, 138 species) 
This order of starfish consists mostly of deep-sea and other cold-water starfish often with a global distribution. The shape is pentagonal or star-shaped with five to fifteen arms. They mostly have poorly developed skeletons with papulae widely distributed on the aboral surface and often spiny pedicellariae. This group includes the slime star.

Extinct groups
Extinct groups within the Asteroidea include:
 † Calliasterellidae, with the type genus Calliasterella from the Devonian and Carboniferous
 † Palastericus, a Devonian genus
 † Trichasteropsida, with the Triassic genus Trichasteropsis (at least 2 species)

Phylogeny

External

Starfish are deuterostome animals, like the chordates. A 2014 analysis of 219 genes from all classes of echinoderms gives the following phylogenetic tree. The times at which the clades diverged is shown under the labels in millions of years ago (mya).

Internal

The phylogeny of the Asteroidea has been difficult to resolve, with visible (morphological) features proving inadequate, and the question of whether traditional taxa are clades in doubt. The phylogeny proposed by Gale in 1987 is:

The phylogeny proposed by Blake in 1987 is:

Later work making use of molecular evidence, with or without the use of morphological evidence, had by 2000 failed to resolve the argument. In 2011, on further molecular evidence, Janies and colleagues noted that the phylogeny of the echinoderms "has proven difficult", and that "the overall phylogeny of extant echinoderms remains sensitive to the choice of analytical methods". They presented a phylogenetic tree for the living Asteroidea only; using the traditional names of starfish orders where possible, and indicating "part of" otherwise, the phylogeny is shown below. The Solasteridae are split from the Velatida, and the old Spinulosida is broken up.

Human relations

In research

Starfish are deuterostomes, closely related, together with all other echinoderms, to chordates, and are used in reproductive and developmental studies. Female starfish produce large numbers of oocytes that are easily isolated; these can be stored in a pre-meiosis phase and stimulated to complete division by the use of 1-methyladenine. Starfish oocytes are well suited for this research as they are large and easy to handle, transparent, simple to maintain in sea water at room temperature, and they develop rapidly. Asterina pectinifera, used as a model organism for this purpose, is resilient and easy to breed and maintain in the laboratory.

Another area of research is the ability of starfish to regenerate lost body parts. The stem cells of adult humans are incapable of much differentiation and understanding the regrowth, repair and cloning processes in starfish may have implications for human medicine.

Starfish also have an unusual ability to expel foreign objects from their bodies, which makes them difficult to tag for research tracking purposes.

In legend and culture

An aboriginal Australian fable retold by the Welsh school headmaster William Jenkyn Thomas (1870–1959) tells how some animals needed a canoe to cross the ocean. Whale had one but refused to lend it, so Starfish kept him busy, telling him stories and grooming him to remove parasites, while the others stole the canoe. When Whale realized the trick he beat Starfish ragged, which is how Starfish still is today.

In 1900, the scholar Edward Tregear documented The Creation Song, which he describes as "an ancient prayer for the dedication of a high chief" of Hawaii. Among the "uncreated gods" described early in the song are the male Kumulipo ("Creation") and the female Poele, both born in the night, a coral insect, the earthworm, and the starfish.

Georg Eberhard Rumpf's 1705 The Ambonese Curiosity Cabinet describes the tropical varieties of Stella Marina or Bintang Laut, "Sea Star", in Latin and Malay respectively, known in the waters around Ambon. He writes that the Histoire des Antilles reports that when the sea stars "see thunder storms approaching, [they] grab hold of many small stones with their little legs, looking to ... hold themselves down as if with anchors".

Starfish is the title of novels by Peter Watts and Jennie Orbell, and in 2012, Alice Addison wrote a non-fiction book titled Starfish - A year in the life of bereavement and depression. The Starfish and the Spider is a 2006 business management book by Ori Brafman and Rod Beckstrom; its title alludes to the ability of the starfish to regenerate itself because of its decentralized nervous system, and the book suggests ways that a decentralized organisation may flourish.

In the Nickelodeon animated television series SpongeBob SquarePants, the eponymous character's best friend is a dim-witted starfish, Patrick Star.

As food

Starfish are widespread in the oceans, but are only occasionally used as food. There may be good reason for this: the bodies of numerous species are dominated by bony ossicles, and the body wall of many species contains saponins, which have an unpleasant taste, and others contain tetrodotoxins which are poisonous. Some species that prey on bivalve molluscs can transmit paralytic shellfish poisoning. Georg Eberhard Rumpf found few starfish being used for food in the Indonesian archipelago, other than as bait in fish traps, but on the island of "Huamobel"  the people cut them up, squeeze out the "black blood" and cook them with sour tamarind leaves; after resting the pieces for a day or two, they remove the outer skin and cook them in coconut milk. Starfish are sometimes eaten in China, Japan and in Micronesia.

As collectables

Starfish are in some cases taken from their habitat and sold to tourists as souvenirs, ornaments, curios or for display in aquariums. In particular, Oreaster reticulatus, with its easily accessed habitat and conspicuous coloration, is widely collected in the Caribbean. In the early to mid 20th century, this species was common along the coasts of the West Indies, but collection and trade have severely reduced its numbers. In the State of Florida, O. reticulatus is listed as endangered and its collection is illegal. Nevertheless, it is still sold throughout its range and beyond. A similar phenomenon exists in the Indo-Pacific for species such as Protoreaster nodosus.

In industry and military history

With its multiple arms, the starfish provides a popular metaphor for computer networks, companies and software tools. It is also the name of a seabed imaging system and company.

Starfish has repeatedly been chosen as a name in military history. Three ships of the Royal Navy have borne the name HMS Starfish: an A-class destroyer launched in 1894; an R-class destroyer launched in 1916; and an S-class submarine launched in 1933 and lost in 1940. In the World War II, Starfish sites were large-scale night-time decoys created during The Blitz to simulate burning British cities. Starfish Prime was a high-altitude nuclear test conducted by the United States on 9 July 1962.

References

Bibliography

External links 

 , a blog about sea stars by a passionate and professional specialist.

 
Articles containing video clips
Late Ordovician first appearances
Extant Ordovician first appearances
Taxa named by Henri Marie Ducrotay de Blainville